The Saarland national under-18 football team represented the Saar Protectorate at the under-18 age level in men's international football. The team participated in the UEFA European Under-18 Championship (previously the FIFA International Youth Tournament) between 1953 and 1956. The team ceased to exist in 1957, when control of Saarland was given to West Germany.

History
Saarland played their first under-18 match on 31 March 1953 in the 1953 FIFA Youth Tournament Under-18 against Spain, which finished as a 0–5 loss. They finished the tournament tied in 13th place, after they refused to play extra time in their match against Switzerland. They also finished in 13th place the following year, winning 3–0 against France for the team's best ever result. The following two editions only featured a group stage, with Saarland finishing third out of four teams in their group on both occasions. Their last match in the 1956 tournament was a 2–2 draw with Belgium on 1 April. The team played no further matches as the Saar Protectorate became a part of West Germany at the start of 1957.

UEFA European Under-18 Championship record

Notes

References

European national under-18 association football teams
U18
Youth football in Germany